The Painda Khel is a clan of Tanoli origin which inhabits lands in Bajna and Mansehra and north of Mansehra District in Pakistan. In the 19th century they fought battles against the British with the Hazara Expedition of 1888.

References

Swati Pashtun tribes
Social groups of Pakistan
Pashto-language surnames
Pakistani names